Aegialoalaimus is a genus of nematodes belonging to the family Aegialoalaimidae.

The species of this genus are found in Europe and America.

Species:

Aegialoalaimus bratteni 
Aegialoalaimus conicaudatus 
Aegialoalaimus cylindricauda 
Aegialoalaimus elegans 
Aegialoalaimus leptosoma 
Aegialoalaimus paratenuicaudatus 
Aegialoalaimus punctatus 
Aegialoalaimus sabulicola 
Aegialoalaimus setosa 
Aegialoalaimus tenuicaudatus 
Aegialoalaimus tenuis 
Aegialoalaimus tereticauda

References

Nematodes